The Abuabdullo Rudaki Institute of Language and Literature is the regulatory body for the Tajik variety of Persian language, headquartered in Dushanbe, Tajikistan. It is one of the oldest research institutes in the Tajik Academy of Sciences; it acts as the official authority on the language and contributes to linguistic research on the Tajik language and other languages of Tajikistan.

The Institute of Language and Literature in the Tajik Republic was founded during the Soviet era on 17 March 1932. In 1958, on the 1100th anniversary of the birth of the founder of Persian-Tajik literature Abuabdullo Rudaki, the institute was named in his honour.

See also
 Academy of Persian Language and Literature
 Academy of Sciences of Afghanistan
 Persian studies

References

External links 
 Official website

1932 establishments in the Soviet Union
Organizations established in 1932
Cultural organizations based in Tajikistan
Language regulators
Tajik language
Persian language
Persian literature
Education in Tajikistan